Amphitrite is a genus of polychaete belonging to the family Terebellidae. The genus has cosmopolitan distribution.

Species 
The World Register of Marine Species recognizes the following 21 species:

 Amphitrite alcicornis Fauvel, 1909
 Amphitrite attenuata Moore, 1906
 Amphitrite brunnea (Stimpson, 1853)
 Amphitrite buzhinskaje Jirkov, 2020
 Amphitrite chloraema (Schmarda, 1861)
 Amphitrite cirrata Müller, 1776
 Amphitrite fauveli Jirkov, Ravara & Cunha, 2018
 Amphitrite haematina (Grube, 1871)
 Amphitrite jucunda (Kinberg, 1866)
 Amphitrite kerguelensis McIntosh, 1876
 Amphitrite leptobranchia Caullery, 1944
 Amphitrite lobocephala Hsieh, 1994
 Amphitrite malayensis Caullery, 1944
 Amphitrite marchilensis Hartmann-Schröder, 1965
 Amphitrite oculata Hessle, 1917
 Amphitrite ornata (Leidy, 1855)
 Amphitrite rubra (Risso, 1826)
 Amphitrite rzhavskyi Jirkov, 2020
 Amphitrite scylla (Savigny, 1822)
 Amphitrite variabilis (Risso, 1826)
 Amphitrite ventricosa Bosc, 1802

References 

Terebellida
Polychaete genera
Taxa named by Otto Friedrich Müller